Artur Sergeyevich Paporotnyi (born 28 November 1985) is a Russian beach soccer player. Paporotnyi debuted in the Russian national beach soccer team in 2011. Since 2013, he is playing for BSC Kristall.

Career
Paporotnyi was born 28 November 1985 in Mirny, Bryansk Oblast. As a child he played basketball; as a reminder he often performs a basketball shot hand movement on the pitch. Then he started playing association football, he also tried himself in futsal. In 2009, he switched to beach soccer, debuting for City. His first coach was S. Stepanov.

He debuted for the Russia national beach soccer team in 2011. His first match was against Romania at the 2011 Euro Beach Soccer League. After that he was chosen for the 2011 FIFA Beach Soccer World Cup, which Russia won.

In 2019, Artur Paporotnyi, Anton Shkarin, Maxim Chuzhkov and Yuri Krashennikov scored a goal each at the qualification tournament for the 2019 FIFA Beach Soccer World Cup, bringing the score 7–1 against Italy.

Achievements

National team
FIFA Beach Soccer World Cup champion: 2011, 2021
Euro Beach Soccer League champion: 2011, 2017
Euro Winners Cup champion: 2014, 2015, 2020, 2021

Clubs
Russian National champion: 2013, 2015, 2016
Russian Cup champion: 2015, 2017

Individually
2017 Euro Beach Soccer League, Superfinal – Best Player
2021 FIFA Beach Soccer World Cup – Silver Ball

References

External links
Profile on Beach Soccer Russia 
Profile on BSC Kristall 

1985 births
Living people
People from Bryansk Oblast
Russian beach soccer players
European Games gold medalists for Russia
Beach soccer players at the 2015 European Games
European Games medalists in beach soccer
Beach soccer players at the 2019 European Games
Sportspeople from Bryansk Oblast